The Brunswick and Western Railroad (known earlier as the Brunswick and Florida Railroad and the Brunswick and Albany Railroad) is a historic railroad in southern Georgia that at its greatest extent ran from Brunswick near the coast to Albany.  Segments of the line still exist today. The Brunswick and Florida Railroad ran from Brunswick west to Glenmore (located about 10 miles west of present-day Waycross), where it would connect with the Atlantic and Gulf Railroad.

History
In the 1830s, a railroad route from North Florida through South Georgia and onwards to the Atlantic coast was the goal of several different competing companies. The route was desired due to the growth of cotton production in the area and the lack of navigable rivers through the area. The head of navigation on the Flint River was at Albany, Georgia, the center of cotton trade in the region; however, the Flint River was relatively small and Apalachicola Bay lacked a decent harbor. There were two major ports on Georgia's Atlantic coast at the time: Brunswick and Savannah.

The Brunswick and Florida Railroad received its charter from the Georgia General Assembly on December 22, 1835. Their charter allowed them to select a route between Brunswick, Georgia and the Florida line, and forbade another route from existing with 20 miles (32 km) of their own.

Before any rails were laid by the company, they were already planning on branch routes. In November 1836, a bill was introduced to the Georgia legislature to authorize the Brunswick and Florida Railroad to construct a branch to the Flint or Chattahoochee Rivers. That bill became law on December 24, 1836. By July 1837, an initial survey of the route has been completed. The end of the route was going to be near the confluence of the Flint and Chattahoochee Rivers on the Florida-Georgia line.

The company spent the late 1830s attempting to raise funding for the railroad. In the summer of 1838, Thomas Butler King, then the president of the company, toured South Georgia and was able to raise $80,000 in stock subscriptions from the citizens of Lowndes County, Georgia and $220,000 from the citizens of Thomas County, Georgia.

No progress was made for over a decade, but by 1852 efforts were once again being made to get the railroad started. As part of the renewed effort, a line from Troupville, Georgia to Albany, Georgia was being planned. Construction was finally set to start on November 1, 1852. By June 1853, 12 miles of the route had been graded with 5.5 miles of rail laid.

Brunswick versus Savannah
In February 1854, the Savannah and Albany Railroad Company rebranded themselves the Savannah, Albany, and Gulf Railroad through a new charter from the state and began plans for a Florida route, a route that was forbidden by the Brunswick and Florida Railroad's charter. By April 1854, citizens in South Georgia were hoping that the two companies would avoid competition with one another and construct a "main trunk" line together. In February 1855, Col. Charles L. Schlatter arrived in Georgia to take over the role as chief engineer for the construction of the railroad. Col. Schlatter was an accomplished and eminent civil engineer, who in early life was chief engineer of the state of Pennsylvania and of the Ogdensburg Railroad of New York. Col. Schlatter is the namesake of Schlatterville, Georgia which is located just west of Hoboken. The directors' report from May 1855, detailed the conditions of the company. 20 miles of the route had then been graded and 5 miles of rail laid. The company owned one locomotive and six freight cars.

In November 1855, a bill was introduced to the Georgia General Assembly by Alexander Lawton to give the Savannah, Albany, and Gulf's southern branch line the right to cross the line of the Brunswick and Florida, but it did not pass. In early 1856, a compromise was reached between the two competing companies was passed by the Georgia General Assembly. They would both build to a certain point in south Georgia, and then a main trunk line was to be built. The company chartered to build that line was incorporated as the Atlantic and Gulf Railroad Company in February 1856. Construction of the Atlantic and Gulf was forbidden until the junction of the Brunswick and Florida Railroad and the Savannah, Albany, and Gulf Railroad. At that time the Brunswick and Florida had only completed the first 32 miles (51 km) of its line. 

Members of the Brunswick and Florida Railroad Company also met in December 1856 to discuss the changes to the charter made by the Georgia legislature. They recommended that their company refuse to junction with or surrender charter privileges to the Atlantic and Gulf Company unless it was beneficial to the development of the city of Brunswick. They also wanted the junction, if it was to take place, to be located east of the Satilla River. The Brunswick and Florida Railroad Company was still busy in April 1857 trying to get the citizen of Lowndes and Berrien counties on their side and claimed that $40,000 in stock had been raised in Lowndes County alone. 

By October 1857, the route had been graded to Big Creek in modern Brantley County, but the company lacked the iron to complete the line to that point. By November 1858, additional rails were purchased to complete the railroad to its junction with the Atlantic and Gulf and extension of the road to Albany was being called for.

A route from Albany to railroad's junction with the Atlantic and Gulf was surveyed in April 1859 by chief engineer Charles L. Schlatter. The company's intention to build a route to Albany was announced a few weeks later. Grading of the route from the junction with the Atlantic and Gulf to Waresboro, Georgia began in August 1860.

Civil War
Construction of the railroad continued during the American Civil War. The route from Brunswick to Teabeauville was complete by late August 1861. By that point in time the Atlantic and Gulf Railroad had already been completed to Thomasville, Georgia. The Brunswick and Florida original route called for it to go through Thomasville on its way to Florida. In September 1861, Charles Lyon Schlatter Sr was elected president of the railroad company. At the same meeting, it was decided to change the name of the railroad to the Brunswick and Albany Railroad. The name change was made official by the legislature during that December.

On June 10, 1863, two Union gunboats went up the Turtle River and attempted to burn the Brunswick and Albany Railroad's trestle of Buffalo Swamp. The fire was put out by some carpenters after the gunboats left.

In late 1863, the government of the Confederate States of America took much of the Brunswick and Florida's track and used it to complete the connection between the Atlantic and Gulf Railroad's main route to the Florida, Atlantic and Gulf Central Railroad. The new route from Du Pont, Georgia to Live Oak, Florida was the first railroad to connect the states of Florida and Georgia.

Brunswick and Albany Railroad
The name change was reaffirmed in 1866 by the new government after the end of the Civil War.
After the war in 1869, the State of Georgia provided about $6 million in bonds for the railroad to rebuild.  

Rebuilding of the railroad commenced in August 1869, with track being laid all the way to Waynesville, Georgia by 24 November 1869. On January 25, 1870, the rails were complete to the east bank of the Satilla River, and by March 10, 1870, the track was once again complete to Big Creek at the 47.5 mile post.
The westernmost segment of the original line from Schlatterville to Glenmore was never rebuilt, instead, the line from Schlatterville to Albany became the only online line.

In May 1870, rails had once again been laid up the junction with the Atlantic and Gulf Railroad at Tebeauville.

By January 1871, the construction crew had laid rails all the way to Alapaha River near modern Alapaha, Georgia. Before the road had even reached Albany, the company was thinking of extending the route to Eufaula, Alabama. Surveys for the route west from Albany began in March 1871. Track laying reached the Little River near what would soon become Tifton in April of that same year. Only 30 miles were left between Albany and the completed line by July 1871. Work on grading the line from Albany to Cuthbert and on to Eufaula was set to begin in June 1871, when many plantation owners along the line began demanding damage payments for allowing the railroad a right of way through their land. The railroad refused to pay any damages to the owners and permanently suspended construction of the line west of Cuthbert. The first train reached Albany from Brunswick on October 2, 1871.

Shortly after the railroad's completion to Albany, the railroad fail upon hard financial times and was unable to pay the contractors and workers involved with the construction of the railroad. This led to the governor of Georgia intervening due to state bonds that had been used to fund the construction of the railroad. The Atlantic and Gulf began running thrice-weekly trains from to Albany from the Brunswick and Albany's junction with its own line in late November.

While the lawsuits regarding the finances of the companies were being contested, new communities began to grow along the route of the railroad. In April 1872, Col. Nelson Tift established a sawmill settlement at the crossroads of the Brunswick and Florida Railroad and the Union Road. The next month a post office was established near the Alapaha River along the line called Allapaha. In October 1873, in order to settle the debts of the railroad it was sold to German investors.

Later history
In 1882, the line's name would change again to the Brunswick and Western Railroad.

The Atlantic and Gulf Railroad was bought by Henry B. Plant in 1879.  It was renamed the Savannah, Florida and Western Railway and would become the main line of the Plant System.  The Brunswick and Western Railroad was purchased by the Plant System in 1888 and was fully integrated into the system by 1901.

In 1902, the entire Plant System was bought by the Atlantic Coast Line Railroad.  The Atlantic Coast Line continued to operate the Brunswick and Western as line as their Albany–Waycross Line (P Line) west of Waycross and as their Waycross–Brunswick Line (O Line) east of Waycross.  The Atlantic Coast Line became the Seaboard Coast Line Railroad in 1967 after merging with their former rival, the Seaboard Air Line Railroad.  In 1980, the Seaboard Coast Line's parent company merged with the Chessie System, creating the CSX Corporation.  The CSX Corporation initially operated the Chessie and Seaboard Systems separately until 1986, when they were merged into CSX Transportation.

Current conditions
The Brunswick and Western Railroad still exists today in segments.  CSX still operates the line from Waycross to Brunswick as their Brunswick Subdivision.  CSX also continues to operate the line from Waycross to Pearson as the Pearson Spur. 

The remaining line from Albany to Sylvester is now operated by the shortline Georgia and Florida Railway.

Stations

Company presidents

Brunswick and Florida Railroad
 Thomas Butler King (1836-1840s)
 Solomon Foote (1851-)
 Henry S. Welles (1855)
 C. F. Welles Jr (1856,
 Stephen Clay King (1856)
 C. F. Welles Jr (1857)
 Samuel J. Beales (1857)
 Henry S. Welles (1857)
 H. G. Wheeler (1858-1861)
 Charles Lyon Schlatter Sr (1861-1863)

Brunswick and Albany Railroad
 Charles Lyon Schlatter Sr (1863-)
 Hannibal Kimball (1870-1871)

Notes

References

Defunct Georgia (U.S. state) railroads
Railway companies disestablished in 1901
Predecessors of the Atlantic Coast Line Railroad